Flight is an American television anthology series that originally aired in syndication from 1958 to 1959. The series originally aired for one season, with 38 half-hour episodes produced. It was created with the assistance of the United States Air Force and featured retired General George C. Kenney as the host and opening narrator.

Guest stars

Episodes

References

Sources

External links
 Flight at CVTA with episode list
 

1958 American television series debuts
1959 American television series endings
1950s American anthology television series
Aviation television series
First-run syndicated television programs in the United States